Maison du Bonheur is a 2017 Canadian documentary film directed by Sofia Bohdanowicz. It profiles Juliane Sellam, a 77-year-old French astrologer living in Montmartre.

The film premiered at the Buenos Aires International Festival of Independent Cinema on April 23, 2017, and had a limited theatrical release in the U.S. and Canada in 2018.

Synopsis 
Filmed in the Montmartre quarter of Paris, Maison du Bonheur is a portrait of 77-year-old Juliane Sellam, who is as full of life and vibrancy as the iconic neighbourhood she calls home. The film focuses on the daily life of Sellam in the pre-war apartment that the French astrologer has lived in for half a century. In this intimate and eclectic space, Sellam’s world proves to be as expansive as the universe that lies at her doorstep.

Told in 30 episodic segments narrated by Sellam and Bohdanowicz, the matriarch’s life and rich inner world crystallizes though her daily rituals of making coffee, applying makeup, and caring for her geraniums.

Production 
In July 2015, Bohdanowicz embarked to Paris to shoot the film at the behest of Sellam's daughter. For production costs, she sought out a $10,000 line of credit to purchase film stock and rented a 16mm Bolex camera. She shot the film over the course of one month and recorded the sound herself. After filming was complete, she applied to grants for post-production funds.

Release

Critical reception 
On review aggregation website Rotten Tomatoes, the film holds an approval rating of 100% based on 7 reviews, and an average rating of 8.2/10. On Metacritic, the film has a weighted average score of 78 out of 100, based on 5 critics, indicating "generally favorable reviews".

The Globe and Mail's Barry Hertz named the film one of his top 10 films of 2018, calling it "a supremely thoughtful and careful study of one elderly Parisian woman" and "as revealing as it is honest and sincere," adding that, "this is a film to seek out and cherish.” Glenn Kenny of The New York Times selected the film as a Critics' Pick and called it "a profound delight." Corey Atad for Vice Magazine praised the film as "a work of empathic delight, conveying the feeling of a life lived while providing only a glimpse at it."

Accolades

References

External links 
 
 
 
 

2017 films
Canadian documentary films
Films shot in Paris
Films directed by Sofia Bohdanowicz
Films shot in 16 mm film
French-language Canadian films
2010s Canadian films